Dean Spade (born 1977) is an American lawyer, writer, trans activist, and associate professor of law at Seattle University School of Law.

Background
In 2002 he founded the Sylvia Rivera Law Project, a non-profit law collective in New York City that provides free legal services to transgender, intersex and gender non-conforming people who are low-income and/or people of color. Spade was a staff attorney at SRLP from 2002 to 2006, during which time he presented testimony to the National Prison Rape Elimination Commission and helped achieve a major victory for transgender youth in foster care in the Jean Doe v. Bell case. Spade was also involved with the campaign in 2009 to stop Seattle from building a new jail.

The Advocate named Spade one of their "Forty Under 40" in May 2010. Utne Reader named Spade and Tyrone Boucher on their list of "50 Visionaries Who Are Changing Your World" in 2009, for their collaborative project Enough: The Personal Politics of Resisting Capitalism.

Spade was the 2009-2010 Haywood Burns Chair at CUNY Law School, the Williams Institute Law Teaching Fellow at UCLA Law School and Harvard Law School, and was selected to give the 2009-2010 James A. Thomas Lecture at Yale Law School. He received a Jesse Dukeminier Award for the article "Documenting Gender". Spade has written extensively about his personal experience as a trans law professor and student. This includes writings on transphobia in higher education as well as the class privilege of being a professor. He has also written about the limitations of the law's ability to address issues of inequity and injustice. His research interests have included the impact of the War on Terror on transgender rights, the bureaucratization of trans identities, models of non-profit governance in social movements, and the limits of enhanced hate crime penalties. His first book, Normal Life: Administrative Violence, Critical Trans Politics, and the Limits of Law, was released in January 2012 from South End Press and nominated for a 2011 Lambda Literary Award in the category of Transgender Nonfiction.

Spade has collaborated extensively in the past, including editing two special issues of Sexuality Research and Social Policy with Paisley Currah and coauthoring a guide to Medical Therapy and Health Maintenance for Transgender Men with Dr. Nick Gorton. Spade has collaborated particularly frequently with sociologist Craig Willse. Their collaborative projects include I Still Think Marriage is the Wrong Goal, a manifesto and Facebook group. Willse and Spade were also the co-creators of MAKE, "propaganda for activist agitation", a paper zine (1999–2001) and website (2001–2007). In the past, Spade has written other zines including Piss and Vinegar (2002), telling the story of his transphobic arrest during the 2002 World Economic Forum protests in New York City. Mimi Nguyen interviewed Spade and Willse about the experience in Maximumrocknroll.

Personal life
Spade grew up in rural Virginia, the child of a single mother who was sometimes on welfare. At the age of 9 he joined his mother and sister in cleaning houses and offices to make money. Two years later he started cleaning by himself and moved on to painting summer rentals for additional income. At the age of 14 his mother died of lung cancer. Following her death he lived with two sets of foster parents.

Spade graduated summa cum laude from Barnard College of Columbia University with a Bachelor of Arts degree in political science and women's studies, and then graduated from the UCLA School of Law in 2001.  He has written about seeking a mastectomy for sex-reassignment surgery in Los Angeles during this time period, and how the reliance on a mental-health/disability model to gain access to such surgery did not fit a person with a non-binary gender expression.  
 
Spade is Jewish, and has worked closely with the Seattle chapter of Queers Against Israeli Apartheid (QuAIA).

Works

References

External links 

 
 Dean Spade: Seattle University School of Law 
 Haywood Burns Chair in Civil Rights - CUNY School of Law
 Yale Law School - James A. Thomas Lecture - Dean Spade - VIDEO

1977 births
American civil rights activists
Barnard College alumni
City University of New York faculty
Harvard Law School faculty
Jewish American writers
Jewish anti-Zionism in the United States
LGBT Jews
LGBT people from New York (state)
LGBT people from Virginia
American LGBT rights activists
Living people
New York (state) lawyers
Prison abolitionists
Seattle University faculty
Transgender law in the United States
LGBT lawyers
Transgender men
Transgender Jews
Transgender rights activists
UCLA School of Law faculty
Transgender academics
Transgender studies academics
21st-century American Jews
21st-century LGBT people
American transgender writers